Dan Burincă (born 17 June 1972 in Sibiu, Romania) is a retired Romanian artistic gymnast who specialized in rings. He is a silver Olympic medalist and a multiple world medalist on rings.
After retirement he coached at CSS Cetate Deva Romania and KTV Klagenfurt Austria.
Currently, he is a coach at the CSS Sibiu Romania.

References

External links
  
 
 
 
 List of competition results at gymn-forum.net

Living people
1972 births
Sportspeople from Sibiu
Gymnasts at the 1996 Summer Olympics
Romanian male artistic gymnasts
Olympic gymnasts of Romania
Olympic silver medalists for Romania
Medalists at the World Artistic Gymnastics Championships
Romanian gymnastics coaches
Olympic medalists in gymnastics
Medalists at the 1996 Summer Olympics